The large moth family Gelechiidae contains the following genera:

Xenolechia
Xystophora

References

 Natural History Museum Lepidoptera genus database

Gelechiidae
Gelechiid